Vitebsk Vostochny Airport (also known as Vitebsk Southeast Airport)  is an airport serving Vitebsk in Belarus.

Airlines and destinations
There are no regularly-scheduled services at the airport.

References

RussianAirFields.com

Airports built in the Soviet Union
Airports in Belarus
Vitebsk
Buildings and structures in Vitebsk Region